The silver rabbit is a rare breed of domestic rabbit believed to be brought to England by Sir Walter Raleigh in 1592. The breed has been bred for meat, show, and its pelt ever since and is recognized by the American Rabbit Breeders Association (ARBA).

History 
Although the origins of the breed are unknown, one idea is that the silver was a black mutation of the European wild rabbit. The breed was first discovered and brought to Europe in the early 1500s. The silver rapidly spread across Europe and Asia. Then, Sir Walter Raleigh introduced the rabbits to warrens in England. Later, in the 1900s, the breed was brought to the United States of America. The silver was then one of the first breeds to be accepted by ARBA in 1920. However, over time, more efficient meat rabbits were developed. This development caused the silver to lose popularity, resulting in an extremely rare and critically endangered breed.

Appearance and personality 
The silver is a medium-sized breed that is excellent with children and first-time owners. Senior bucks and does should weigh 4-7 pounds. The breed is named for its unique fur whose guard hairs are silver-colored. The fur of the silver rabbit is flyback: when stroked the opposite way of the fur, the fur "flies back" into position. The silver is one of the many breeds accepted by ARBA that has flyback fur.

The silver breed is classified as "Compact" by ARBA.

Currently, black, brown, and fawn silvers can be shown to win best of breed in the United States of America, but the breed also comes in a variety of other colors, such as blue and tortoise. The blue color has a "Certificate of Development" in the United States of America, which allows it to be shown with permission from the show organizers and with a working standard. By contrast, in the United Kingdom, gray (black), brown, fawn, and blue can be shown The three recognized colors in the US are the same as they were nearly a century ago. 

Silvers are known to be friendly and energetic.

See also 

 List of rabbit breeds

References

External links 

 USA National Silver Rabbit Club
 UK National Silver Rabbit Club
 American Rabbit Breeders Association
 Pet Guide
 American Livestock Breeds Conservancy
 Animal Corner
 Livestock Conservancy

Rabbit breeds
Conservation Priority Breeds of the Livestock Conservancy
Rabbit breeds originating in the United States